The Bridge to Total Freedom, or simply The Bridge, is a metaphor used by the Church of Scientology to describe believers' advancement.

Scientology holds that believers advance to a state of Clear when they have freed themselves from the "reactive mind". This takes place in auditing, and is said to be a lifetime commitment. According to the organization, by reaching Clear status, followers are more self-confident, happy, and generally successful in careers and interpersonal relationships. Beyond the state of Clear, Scientologists move through several auditing steps called Operating Thetan (OT) levels. Scientology states that an OT is a state of spiritual awareness in which an individual is able to control self and the environment. According to D. R. Christensen, Scientology is "an individualistic religion with a hierarchical organization of the soteriological system, called the Bridge". The Bridge is described by the organization as a series of soteriological steps.

The Bridge is broken down into two parallel paths, Training and Processing. Processing addresses the Scientologist's "case" or how they function in life as influenced by their "aberrations". The Training path teaches Hubbard's theories on the nature of life and the universe and the techniques of auditing. Participants feel that this knowledge greatly enhances their ability to be effective in life whether they audit another or not. Scientologists can travel up either side of the Bridge and many do both sides. Although not part of the formal Bridge, the chart also lists many optional courses and training actions that can be done by Scientologists.

The Bridge was a result of the culmination of the foundational work on Dianetics and Scientology training that Hubbard had established in the mid-1960s. In 1965, Hubbard published The Bridge to Freedom, which includes the “Classification and Gradation Chart,” which, according to new religious movement specialist James R. Lewis, discusses the steps that organization members must follow as they learn and study Scientology. The chart was a summary of the results of Hubbard's experimentation since the Hubbard Dianetics Research Foundation was founded fifteen years before that time. Save for adjustments and addendums over several years, it delineated the program for reaching Clear status and becoming an Operating Thetan.

Scientologists believe that if an individual is unable to ascend through the Bridge in this lifetime, that the journey up the Bridge can be continued in another life.

Generally, Scientologists spend a lot of money reaching the end of the bridge, as materials and courses take about a total amount of US $380,000 to complete.

References

Scientology beliefs and practices